The golden-winged sparrow (Arremon schlegeli) is a species of bird in the family Passerellidae that can found in Colombia and Venezuela. Its natural habitats are subtropical or tropical dry forests and subtropical or tropical dry shrubland.

Subspecies and its distribution
So far, three subspecies of this bird have been recognized: A. s. schlegeli located along Caribbean costs of Colombia and Venezuela. A. s. fratruelis can be found in Serranía de Macuira, located on the Guajira Peninsula of northern Columbia. The other, A. s. canidorsum, can be found in the north Columbian Andes.

References

golden-winged sparrow
Birds of Colombia
Birds of Venezuela
golden-winged sparrow
golden-winged sparrow
Taxonomy articles created by Polbot
Passerellidae